News of the World is the sixth studio album by the British rock band Queen, released on 28 October 1977 by EMI Records in the United Kingdom and by Elektra Records in the United States. News of the World was the band's second album to be recorded at Sarm and Wessex Sound Studios in London, and engineered by Mike Stone, and was co-produced by the band and Stone.

In 1977, punk rock acts, most notably the Sex Pistols, sparked massive backlash against progressive rock artists such as Queen, to which the band responded by simplifying their symphonic rock sound and gearing towards a more spontaneous hard rock sound. The album subsequently reached number 4 on the UK Albums Chart and went 4× platinum in the United States, reaching number 3 on the US Top Albums chart, and achieving high certifications around the world. It has sold over 4 million copies in United States. Its lead single, "We Are the Champions", reached number two on the UK Singles Chart and number four on the Billboard Hot 100. Critical reaction to News of the World was initially mixed, with many reviewers commenting on the band's change in musical style. However, it has since come to be regarded as one of Queen's greatest albums, while "We Are the Champions" and "We Will Rock You" have since become rock anthems.

Background and recording

After completing the "A Day at the Races Tour" in June 1977, the quartet entered the studio to begin work on their sixth studio offering in July 1977, enlisting Mike Stone as assistant producer at Sarm and Wessex studios in London. The initial activity began on 4 July when Taylor and assistant ‘Crystal’ Taylor arrived in a lorry at Sarm to set up his drum kit, which continued over the next two days. That Wednesday, on 6 July, the rest of the band arrived at Sarm. They did backing track takes for "It's Late".

After recording all the backing tracks, work moved to Wessex Sound, again preceded by two days dedicated to drum kit set up. The lorry arrived on 1 August, and drum kit construction would continue well into 2 August. Andy Turner, a tea boy at Wessex, recalls thinking "You're being charged £200 an hour for this!"  At Wessex, the band overdubbed onto the backing tracks. Some songs had been previously overdubbed, such as "It's Late", "Who Needs You", "All Dead All Dead", and "Sleeping On The Sidewalk". During the last few days of overdubbing, on 22 August, calls to the U.S. would be made regarding venues for the band's tour in November.

According to studio documentation, a lot of sessions had late arrivals, which were usually pre-arranged around an hour before the band would actually arrive. The median shift length was around 3pm - 11pm, but sometimes the band would stay in the studio until 4am if they were falling behind schedule. The last principal overdubbing session was on 23 August, with the first mixes the next day on 24 August. Occasionally, further overdubbing would occur, as mixing continued. On 26 August, "We Are The Champions" was mixed, followed by "Spread Your Wings", and "We Will Rock You" on 27 August, and Take 12 of "Sheer Heart Attack" on 28 August.

After taking a day off for the Summer Bank Holiday, the band went to Leighton Mans Studios and Primrose Hill Studios on 30 August, although the output of these sessions is unknown. They also spent a day at Olympic Studios on 31 August.  The last documented overdubbing session was on 1 September. Mixing continued until 4 September at Wessex, during which there was a delay on 3 September due to technical issues.  That day, Roger appeared on the last episode of the show "Saturday Scene".   The mixes were delivered back to Sarm Studios on 5 September for mastering, which would be completed on 16 September.

They scaled down their complex arrangements and focused on a "rootsier" sound (as Brian May put it). However, the staple of the Queen sound – multi-tracked harmonies and guitar orchestrations – still exist on this album, albeit more subtly than previously. Having received some criticism that their first completely self-produced album, A Day at the Races, was a "boring" album, Queen decided to shift their musical focus towards the mainstream but remain as the producers of the next album. Races garnered criticism as many critics felt that it was too similar to A Night at the Opera, something which the band members themselves acknowledged. In addition, the arrival of punk rock, led by the Sex Pistols, saw the mainstream shift away from progressive rock and more towards simpler rock music. Queen were seen as the antithesis of punk, particularly in their camp influences and elaborate production.

Brian May stated in an interview that "We'd already made a decision that...[after] A Night at the Opera and A Day at the Races, we wanted to go back to basics for News of the World. But it was very timely because the world was looking at punk and things being very stripped down. So in a sense we were conscious, but it was part of our evolution anyway."

In contrast to "Races", which had taken five months to record, only two months were booked to record at Sarm and Wessex Sound Studios. Most of the recording sessions took place in Wessex Studios, which was also where the Sex Pistols were busy recording Never Mind the Bollocks, Here's the Sex Pistols. As such, the two groups had several interactions, including the famous meeting between Mercury and Sid Vicious. Vicious, upon stumbling into Queen's recording studio, asked "Have you succeeded in bringing ballet to the masses yet?" in response to a comment the singer had made in an interview with NME, to which Mercury called him "Simon Ferocious" and replied "We're doing our best, dear." Johnny Rotten also expressed a desire to meet with Mercury. According to Bill Price, who engineered Never Mind the Bollocks, Rotten crawled on all fours across Queen's studio to Mercury, who was playing piano, and said "Hello Freddie" before leaving. May also recalled bumping into Rotten in the corridors and having several conversations about music. Queen's history with the Sex Pistols dated back to December 1976, in which Queen were set to appear on Bill Grundy's Today show. However, Mercury had a toothache, and was forced to schedule a dentist appointment on the same day, his first one in 15 years. As a replacement, EMI offered the Sex Pistols instead, which led to their now famous appearance on the Today show.

Songs

Overview
News of the World shows Queen's songwriting less dominated by Mercury and May than previously, with Roger Taylor and John Deacon composing two songs each. It has been classified as hard rock and arena rock, and has been regarded as a transitional album due to its shift towards a more minimalist production. Its songs are notable for their eclectic themes which would crystallise on future albums Jazz and The Game: "We Will Rock You" and "We Are the Champions" are arena rock, "Who Needs You" features a Latin influence, "Sheer Heart Attack" is punk rock, "Sleeping on the Sidewalk" is based upon blues rock, "Get Down, Make Love" features funk overtones, "My Melancholy Blues" imitates jazz and "Fight from the Inside" was the group's first disco related song.

Side one

"We Will Rock You"

"We Will Rock You" was released as the B-side of "We Are the Champions", and became one of Queen's biggest songs worldwide as a staple of arena and stadium sets. It was a conscious decision by Brian May to make the song simple and anthemic (‘stomp, stomp, clap, pause’ per 4/4 measure), so that their live audience could be more directly involved in the show. In the videos  for ‘We Will Rock You’ and ‘Spread Your Wings’, which shows the band performing in the snow in Roger Taylor's garden, May used a copy of his guitar. He supposedly did not want to submit his Red Special to the weather.

On 7 October 2017, Queen released a Raw Sessions version of the track to celebrate the 40th anniversary of the release of News of the World. It shows a radically different approach to the guitar solo and includes May's count-in immediately prior to the recording.

"We Are the Champions"

According to Freddie Mercury, "We Are the Champions" had already been written in 1975 but was not recorded until 1977. Released as a single with "We Will Rock You", "We Are the Champions" reached number two in the UK and number four in the US. "We Are the Champions" was the first promotional video for which fan club members were invited to participate in the filming. The video was filmed at the New London Theatre on 6 October 1977. Everyone received a free single of "We Are the Champions", a day before the single was released. To thank the audience for their attendance and role in making the video, Queen performed a short free concert after the shoot. It is one of the band's most popular songs.

On 7 October 2017, Queen released a Raw Sessions version of the track to celebrate the 40th anniversary of the release of News of the World. It was made from previously unheard vocal and instrumental takes from the original multi-track tapes. It also presents for the first time the original recorded length of the track, which is two choruses more than the 1977 edited single.

"Sheer Heart Attack"

"Sheer Heart Attack" was half-finished at the time of the 1974 album of the same name. Taylor sang lead on the demo, but for the definitive version the band decided Mercury should sing lead vocals, with Taylor singing the chorus. Rhythm guitar and bass were played by Taylor, apart from some guitar "screams" by May during the instrumental section.

"All Dead, All Dead"
"All Dead, All Dead" was written and sung by May, who also played piano with Mercury on backing vocals. In an episode of In the Studio with Redbeard, May confirmed rumours that the song is partly inspired by the death of his boyhood pet cat.

On 27 October 2017, in celebration of the album's 40th Anniversary, Queen released a specially created "hybrid version" of the track with previously unheard lead vocals by Mercury. It was accompanied with an animated lyric video of a cat exploring a place that is later revealed to be the inside of the robot of the album cover lying motionless in a field.

"Spread Your Wings"

"Spread Your Wings" was written by bassist John Deacon. The piano is played by Mercury, although Deacon mimes it in the music video. The video was filmed in the back garden of Taylor's then house, when the weather was freezing, and the band performed in the snow. Mercury can be seen wearing star-shaped sunglasses in the video. May is seen playing a copy of his Red Special, owing to the cold weather conditions. Also, Taylor can be seen singing in the video despite the fact that there are no backing vocals in the song. It was the first Queen single without backing vocals.

"Fight from the Inside"
"Fight from the Inside" was written and sung by Taylor. In addition to the drums, he also plays rhythm guitar and bass guitar; for the latter he borrowed Deacon's instrument. It is also one of the few songs in the band's discography recorded almost entirely by one member.

Guitarist Slash has cited the guitar riff to this song as one of his favourite riffs of all time.

Side two

"Get Down, Make Love" 

"Get Down, Make Love", written by Mercury, is among the most sexually oriented songs in the Queen catalogue.

The song was introduced into the band's live show immediately after its release, and remained a staple of their "medley" until the end of the Hot Space Tour of 1982. On the Hot Space tour, the song was reduced to the first verse/chorus only as a way to lead into May's guitar solo. In live versions of this song, Taylor used Latin-influenced percussion with timbales on the News of the World Tour, and tightly tuned Remo Roto-Toms on the Jazz Tour, Crazy Tour, The Game and Hot Space tours.

The distinctive 'psychedelic' sound effects heard in the song were not produced on a synthesiser, but on May's Red Special and an Electroharmonix Frequency Analyzer pedal, which he would often do live. The studio cut made use of an Eventide Harmonizer. These sound effects, together with Mercury's moans and groans, were expanded upon during live renditions of the song, the band taking an opportunity to show off the full potential of their stage lights and effects.

A more aggressive version of this song was covered by Trent Reznor's industrial rock project Nine Inch Nails as a B-side for the 1990 single, "Sin". It was later added as a bonus track to the 2010 remastered edition of Pretty Hate Machine.

"Sleeping on the Sidewalk"
"Sleeping on the Sidewalk", a blues excursion, was written and sung by May. It is the only song in their discography to be recorded (except for the vocals) in one take. Lyrically, it deals with an aspiring trumpet player's career, delivered in a "rags-to-riches" fashion. May sings with an American accent and measures the aforementioned trumpet player's success by "bucks" (dollars), as opposed to pounds or "quid". On a close inspection, Deacon can be heard playing the wrong notes in some bass parts, and May can also be heard laughing at the end of the song. It is also one of the few Queen songs not to feature any vocals by Mercury, although he did perform lead vocals in live performances.

The band's web site states they were unaware that they were being recorded, but May has cast doubt on the authenticity of this, though has confirmed the first take of the backing track was used.

"Who Needs You"
"Who Needs You" was a song written by Deacon, who, along with May, plays Spanish guitar. Mercury's lead vocal is entirely panned on the right audio channel while the lead guitar is on the left channel. May also plays maracas and Mercury plays a cowbell.

"It's Late"

"It's Late", written by May, was his idea of treating a song as a three-act theatrical play. It makes use of the tapping technique.

"My Melancholy Blues"
"My Melancholy Blues" was composed by Mercury. There are no backing vocals or guitars. Deacon played fretless bass on stage during this song but used a regular fretted bass on the record.

Artwork and packaging

The album's cover was a painting by American sci-fi artist Frank Kelly Freas. Taylor had an issue of Astounding Science Fiction (October 1953) whose cover art depicted a giant intelligent robot holding the dead body of a man. The caption read: "Please... fix it, Daddy?" to illustrate the story "The Gulf Between" by Tom Godwin. The painting inspired the band to contact Freas, who agreed to alter the painting for their album cover, by replacing the single dead man with the four "dead" band members (with Mercury and May dead in the robot’s hand, Freddie bleeding from his chest and blood on the robot’s middle finger of its opposite hand, and with Taylor and Deacon falling to the ground, Taylor only visible on the back cover).

The inner cover (gatefold) has the robot extending its hand to snatch up the petrified fleeing audience in the shattered auditorium where the corpses were removed. Freas said he was a classical music fan and did not know Queen, and only listened to the band after doing the cover "because I thought I might just hate them, and it would ruin my ideas", but eventually liked their music.

Release

Singles
"We Are the Champions" was released as the first single from the album on 7 October 1977 in the UK, where it reached number 2. In the US it reached number 4.
"Spread Your Wings" followed as the second single. Released in the UK on 10 February 1978, it reached number 34.
"It's Late" is the last single from the album; it was released in 1978, and only in the US, Canada, Japan and New Zealand. It only reached number 74 in the US, failing to chart everywhere else.

Tour
The News of the World Tour was a concert tour by Queen to promote the album. Queen played 26 shows in North America and 21 in Europe, beginning on 11 November 1977 in Portland, United States and concluding the tour on 13 May 1978 in London.

Re-issues
In May 2011, a remastered and expanded reissue of the album was released. This was part of a new record deal between Queen and Universal Music, which meant Queen's association with EMI Records would come to an end after almost 40 years. According to Universal Music, all Queen albums would be remastered and reissued in 2011. This reissue included a deluxe edition which contains five additional tracks. The second batch of albums (the band's middle five albums) was released in June 2011.

On 4 September 2017, Queen released a multi-format deluxe boxset marking the 40th anniversary of the album's original issue by the Virgin EMI label. The set contains previously unreleased outtakes and rarities from the band's archives, in the form of a newly created "alternative" version of the entire album, dubbed Raw Sessions. The boxset also includes a pure analogue vinyl LP, cut from the original analogue master mix tapes, and a brand new one-hour DVD documentary created from backstage material filmed during the North American leg of Queen's 1977 News of the World Tour.

In promotion of the anniversary release, on 6 October Queen released the previously unheard Raw Sessions of "We Are the Champions" and "We Will Rock You". On 27 October, the band published on their official YouTube channel a new version of "All Dead, All Dead" with previously unheard lead vocals by Mercury, and was accompanied with an animated lyric video. The box set was officially released on 17 November 2017.

Reception

News of the World initially received mixed reviews, mostly reflecting on the album's shift towards a more minimalist sound, and away from the band's previous predominantly progressive rock sound. The Washington Post commended the band's experimentation within a range of hard rock to soft rock, while Rolling Stone magazine's Bart Testa noted, "Most of the songs on News of the World either challenge Queen's artistic enemies or endeavor to establish a vision of the new order." He further dismissed the album as "the salient fictions of which today's Top Ten albums are made." For The Village Voice in 1977, Robert Christgau said that one side of the album is devoted to "the futile rebelliousness of the doomed-to-life losers (those saps!) (you saps!) who buy and listen", while the other is devoted to songs about indecent women.

The Daily Mirror hailed it as the "most intriguing Queen album since their finest, Sheer Heart Attack," commenting that "whether all the obvious tension within the band will spur them on, or simply pull them apart, remains to be seen." Although Sounds dismissed side one as "foreboding," they reacted positively to side two, particularly praising "My Melancholy Blues." The Valley News criticised it as being "tamer" than the band's first four albums, but concluded that "Queen still pulls off top honors," particularly praising the production, Mercury's vocals and May's guitar work. In a mixed review, Record Mirror described News as "Queen stripped down to almost basics...it's not a bad album by any means, but it could have been better."

Retrospective reviews of the album have been generally positive. Stephen Thomas Erlewine of AllMusic noted the eclecticism in comparison to "A Day at the Races", describing it as "an explosion of styles that didn't seem to hold to any particular center." He praised May's contributions for giving the album "some lightness", and concluded that "when it works, it's massive, earth-shaking rock & roll, the sound of a band beginning to revel in its superstardom."
In Creem magazine's annual poll, readers voted News of the World as the 19th best album of 1977. BBC Music's Daryl Easlea said that the album is an exceptional showcase of "Queen's unerring ability to sound absolutely like no-other group – even when parodying other musical styles". Greg Kot of the Chicago Tribune observed that Queen had "ventured deeper into stadium rock", while Brendan Schroer of Sputnikmusic also noted the relation to stadium rock, calling it "the great arena rock wonder" with very few flaws.

The 40th anniversary release prompted several more reviews, with David Chiu of The Quietus calling it "a work that had swagger and attitude," while Loudersound wrote that "Despite damping down their instincts so punks wouldn’t spit at them, they still sound like flamboyance has burst through the wall, riding a Harley and wearing a tiara." Several publications have hailed it as the one of the band's greatest albums. NME ranked it as the best Queen album, describing it as "their sharpest, surest set", while Christopher Thelen of the Daily Vault praised it for being "the best mixture of musical styles they had ever achieved" and Queen's "creative peak."

In popular culture
The album as a whole has been released on Super Audio CD. In 2012, the TV show Family Guy dedicated an episode plot line to the album cover, in which Stewie Griffin is frightened of the cover. Show creator Seth MacFarlane stated that it was based on his own fear of the cover when he was a child.

Marvel paid tribute to News of the World on the cover of X-Men Gold #11. The cover, by artist Mike del Mindo, depicts a Sentinel holding Old Man Logan and Kitty Pryde as Colossus plummets to the ground.

The giant robot from the album cover, also known as "Frank", was used as a special effect during the songs "We Will Rock You" and "Killer Queen" for the 2017–18 Queen + Adam Lambert Tour, which was in celebration of the album's 40th anniversary.

Track listing
All lead vocals by Freddie Mercury unless noted.

Original release

40th anniversary edition
The multi-format deluxe box set, released in 2017, contains previously unreleased outtakes and rarities from the band's archives, as well as a newly created "alternative" version of the entire album, dubbed Raw Sessions. The box set includes a pure analogue vinyl LP, cut from the original analogue master mix tapes, and a brand new one-hour DVD documentary created from backstage material filmed during the North American leg of Queen's 1977 News of the World tour.

Vinyl LP: The Original Album - New Pure Analogue Cut

CD one: 2011 Bob Ludwig Remaster of the original album

Personnel
Information is based on the album's Liner NotesTrack numbering refers to CD and digital releases of the album.
Queen
Freddie Mercury – lead vocals , backing vocals , piano , hand claps , cowbell , foot stamping 
Brian May – electric guitar , acoustic guitar , piano , hand claps , maracas , foot stamping , backing vocals , lead vocals 
Roger Taylor – drums , rhythm guitar , bass guitar , additional guitars , backing vocals , lead vocals 
John Deacon – bass guitar , acoustic guitar  hand claps , foot stamping

Charts

Weekly charts

Year-end charts

Certifications

References

External links
Queen official website: Discography: News of the World: includes lyrics of all non-bonus tracks except "We Will Rock You", "We Are the Champions", "Sheer Heart Attack", "It's Late".
Lyrics of "We Will Rock You", "Sheer Heart Attack", "It's Late" at Queen official website (from Queen Rocks)
Lyrics of "We Are the Champions" from Live Magic version (first verse, chorus) at Queen official website
Official YouTube videos: Video Competition winner, Live at The Bowl

1977 albums
Queen (band) albums
Elektra Records albums
EMI Records albums
Hollywood Records albums
Parlophone albums